The 1993 Tennessee Volunteers football team represented the University of Tennessee in the 1993 NCAA Division I-A football season.  The Volunteers offense scored 484 points while the defense allowed 175 points. Phillip Fulmer was the head coach and led the club to an appearance in the Florida Citrus Bowl.

Schedule

Alabama was forced to forfeit the 17–17 tie per NCAA sanctions.

Roster

Team players drafted into the NFL

Awards and honors

References

Tennessee
Tennessee Volunteers football seasons
Tennessee Volunteers football